A candy cane is a cane-shaped stick candy often associated with Christmastide, as well as Saint Nicholas Day. It is traditionally white with red stripes and flavored with peppermint, but they also come in a variety of other flavors and colors.

History
A record of the 1837 exhibition of the Massachusetts Charitable Mechanic Association, where confections were judged competitively, mentions "stick candy". A recipe for straight peppermint candy sticks, white with colored stripes, was published in The Complete Confectioner, Pastry-Cook, and Baker, in 1844. The earliest documentation of a "candy cane" is found in the short story "Tom Luther's Stockings", published in Ballou's Monthly Magazine in 1866. Although described as "mammoth", no mention of color or flavor was provided. The Nursery monthly magazine mentions "candy-canes" in association with Christmas in 1874, and Babyland magazine describes "tall, twisted candy canes" being hung on a Christmas tree in 1882.

Folklore

A common folkloric story of the origin of candy canes says that in 1670, in Cologne, Germany, the choirmaster at Cologne Cathedral, wishing to remedy the noise caused by children in his church during the Living Crèche tradition of Christmas Eve, asked a local candy maker for some "sugar sticks" for them. In order to justify the practice of giving candy to children during worship services, he asked the candy maker to add a crook to the top of each stick, which would help children remember the shepherds who visited the infant Jesus. In addition, he used the white color of the converted sticks to teach children about the Christian belief in the sinless life of Jesus. From Germany, candy canes spread to other parts of Europe, where they were handed out during plays reenacting the Nativity. The candy cane became associated with Christmastide.

Production

As with other forms of stick candy, the earliest canes were manufactured by hand. Chicago confectioners the Bunte Brothers filed one of the earliest patents for candy cane making machines in the early 1920s.

In 1919 in Albany, Georgia, Robert McCormack began making candy canes for local children and by the middle of the century, his company (originally the Famous Candy Company, then the Mills-McCormack Candy Company, and later Bobs Candies) had become one of the world's leading candy cane producers. Candy cane manufacturing initially required significant labor that limited production quantities; the canes had to be bent manually as they came off the assembly line to create their curved shape and breakage often ran over 20 percent. McCormack's brother-in-law, Gregory Harding Keller, was a seminary student in Rome who spent his summers working in the candy factory back home. In 1957, Keller, as an ordained Roman Catholic priest of the Diocese of Little Rock, patented his invention, the Keller Machine, which automated the process of twisting soft candy into spiral striping and cutting it into precise lengths as candy canes.

Use during Saint Nicholas Day
On Saint Nicholas Day celebrations, candy canes are given to children as they are also said to represent the crosier of the Christian bishop, Saint Nicholas; crosiers allude to the Good Shepherd, a name sometimes used to refer to Jesus of Nazareth.

See also
 Polkagris
 Stick candy

References

External links

 
 St. Nicholas Day Blessing of Candy Canes

Candy
Christian symbols
Christmas food